Herbert Reeves was a male athlete who competed for England.

Athletics career
He competed for England in the hammer and shot put at the 1934 British Empire Games in London.

References

English male hammer throwers
Athletes (track and field) at the 1934 British Empire Games
English male shot putters
Commonwealth Games competitors for England